Koza Mostra is a Greek rock band founded by Ilias Kozas in 2011. It consists of Ilias Kozas (vocals, classical and electric guitar), Stelios Tsompanidis (drums, backing vocals), Tasos Korkovelos (keyboards, backing vocals), Dimitris Christonis (bass guitar), Tasos Gentzis (saxophone, backing vocals) and Petros Lagontzos (electric guitar, backing vocals). The band fuses ska, punk, and rock music together with the style of traditional Greek folk music such as Macedonian Greek music and rebetiko. They are also known for performing in kilts or fustanella.

They represented Greece in the Eurovision Song Contest 2013 with Agathonas Iakovidis and the song "Alcohol Is Free", coming 6th in the final.

Their maiden album Keep up the Rhythm, that was released on 2013, reached triple Platinum certification from Greek music industry authority IFPI.

In late 2017, they released their second album entitled Corrida.

Discography

Albums

Singles

Awards

References

External links
 

Greek musical groups
Eurovision Song Contest entrants of 2013
Eurovision Song Contest entrants for Greece
Musical groups from Thessaloniki
Modern Greek-language singers